The Federation of Parties of the Mexican People was a socialist political party that existed from 1945 to 1954.

The party was founded by Genovevo de la O, a former Zapatista commander, in 1945. The FPPM drew most of its support from left wing academics and soldiers that had grown disillusioned with the almost omnipotent Institutional Revolutionary Party (PRI), and believed the PRI no longer represented the ideas of the Mexican Revolution. Notable members of the FPPM were Marcelino García Barragán, Rubén Jaramillo, Francisco J. Múgica, José C. Valadés and Miguel Henríquez Guzmán. Most of them had been supporters of Emiliano Zapata and revolucionary leaders , and the FPPM was notable for being the last split from the PRI that included leaders who had participated in the Mexican Revolution.

Henríquez Guzmán was the presidential candidate for the FPPM in the 1952 presidential elections. Henríquez claimed to have been victorious, but the official result showed PRI candidate Adolfo Ruiz Cortines to be the winner. FPPM supporters organized a protest march against the alleged election fraud, but the government responded with a violent crackdown on the protesters.

In 1954 the government accused the party of involvement in a terrorist attack against an army barracks in Ciudad Madera and the party was banned.
Socialist parties in Mexico
Political parties established in 1945
1954 disestablishments in Mexico
Defunct political parties in Mexico
Social democratic parties in North America
1945 establishments in Mexico